Arulmigu Uthanda Velayudhaswamy temple (Arulmigu Uttaṇṭa vēlāyudhasāmy tirukkōvil) is a historic 9th century old Hindu temple located on the Uthiyur Hills near Uthiyur in the Tiruppur district, Tamil Nadu, India. It is dedicated to lord Velayudhasamy, a form of Kartikeya and his consorts Valli and Deivanai. The temple is located at the hilltop of the ancient Hills patrionised by Arunagirinathar authored Thiruppugal.

It is one of the most prominent temples of Lord Muruga in Tirupur district. It is located along the Erode - Dharapuram Tamil Nadu State Highway 83A, 14Km from town of Kangeyam and 18Km from Dharapuram.

Functioning of Temple 
This Shaivite temple built in dravidian architecture follows Karana Agama rules based on Saiva Siddhanta philosophy. 2 periods of puja have been conducted for this temple. This temple owns 1500 acres of land. Annual festival is held on Panguni month in this temple. This temple is an important pilgrimage for Palani Pada Yatra devotees.

History 
The temple belongs to the ninth century. This temple is considered auspicious for Kongu Velalar Gounder community as it is partionised by sage Konganar who is a Siddhar from the same community. The Uthiyur Hills is referred to as Uthimalai in the Thirupugal anthology (songs 611, 612).

Temple Board 
This temple has a sanctums for Kalikumaraswamy, Kailasanadhar and Idumbakumarasamy. The temple is under the control of the Hindu Charities Department under the category of Principal Temples. It is administered by a non-hereditary trustee system.

Temple Structure 
It is situated 100 steps above the ground on top of the Uthiyur hills. The temple entrance is on the south side. In the east is the Rajagopuram with the gate. In the sanctum sanctorum, Uthanda Velayudha Swami stands five feet high towards the east. It is noteworthy that his statue is located towards the west in the direction of Lord Palani. Adjacent to him are the shrines of Lord Ganesha and Bhairava.

Other shrines in Uthiyur Hills 
Konkana Siddhar Temple and Thavapeedam, Uthandavelayudaswamy Temple, Mariamman Temple,  Idumbakumaraswamy Temple, Uchivinayakar Thirukoil, Hanumantharayaswamy Temple, Prakalanayaki Sametha - Kailasanathar Temple, Chetty Thambiran Siddhar Temple are other temples located in the Uthiyur Hills.

References 

Murugan temples in Tamil Nadu
Hindu temples in Tiruppur district